Edward Warren was an Irish Anglican dean in the 17th century.

He graduated from Trinity College, Dublin, B.A. in 1608 and M.A. in 1612.

He was  Dean of Emly from 1661 to 1626  when he became Dean of Ossory.

One of his sons, Major Abel Warren, was MP for Kilkenny and predeceased him; the other and his heir, Edward, was executed for treason in 1663.

References

17th-century Irish Anglican priests
Alumni of Trinity College Dublin
Deans of Emly
Deans of Ossory
Deans of Kilkenny
Year of birth missing
Year of death missing